The public interest is "the welfare  or well-being of the general public" and society.

Overview
Economist Lok Sang Ho in his Public Policy and the Public Interest argues that the public interest must be assessed impartially and, therefore, defines the public interest as the "ex ante welfare of the representative individual." Under a thought experiment, by assuming that there is an equal chance for one to be anyone in society and, thus, could benefit or suffer from a change, the public interest is by definition enhanced whenever that change is preferred to the status quo ex ante. This approach is "ex ante", in the sense that the change is not evaluated after the fact but assessed before the fact without knowing whether one would actually benefit or suffer from it.

This approach follows the "veil of ignorance" approach, which was first proposed by John Harsanyi but popularized by John Rawls in his 1971 Theory of Justice. Historically, however, the approach can be traced to John Stuart Mill, who, in his letter to George Grote, explained that "human happiness, even one's own, is in general more successfully pursued by acting on general rules, than by measuring the consequences of each act; and this is still more the case with the general happiness, since any other plan would not only leave everybody uncertain what to expect, but would involve perpetual quarrelling..."

The Institute of Chartered Accountants in England and Wales argues that applying a detailed definition is likely to result in unintended consequences, in Acting in the Public Interest(2012). Instead, each circumstance needs to be assessed based on criteria such as the relevant public, wants, and constraints. The key to assessing any public interest decision is transparency of the decision-making process, including balancing competing interests.

Law

“Public interest law” is a term that became widely adopted in the United States during and after the social turmoil of the 1960s. It built upon a tradition exemplified by Louis Brandeis, who before becoming a U.S. Supreme Court justice incorporated advocacy for the interests of the general public into his legal practice. 
In a celebrated 1905 speech, Brandeis decried the legal profession, complaining that “able lawyers have to a large extent allowed themselves to become adjuncts of great corporations and have neglected their obligation to use their powers for the protection of the people.”  In the late 1960s and 1970s, large numbers of American law school graduates began to seek “relevance” in their work — wishing to have an effect on the social issues that were so visibly and hotly debated within American society at that time. They defined themselves as public interest lawyers in order to distinguish themselves from the “corporate adjuncts” referred to by Brandeis.

Public interest law does not describe a body of law or a legal field; the term was adopted to describe whom the public interest lawyers were representing, rather than what matters they would work on. Instead of representing powerful economic interests, they chose to be advocates for otherwise underrepresented individuals. Consequently, a significant current in public interest lawyering has always emphasized the need to provide legal services to those living in poverty. The term has grown, however, to encompass a broader range of activities of lawyers and non-lawyers working toward a multitude of objectives, including civil rights, civil liberties, women's rights, consumer rights, environmental protection, and so on. Nevertheless, a common denominator for public interest lawyers in the United States and in a growing number of countries remains the ethic of “fighting for the little guy”—that is, representing the underrepresented and vulnerable segments of society.

Governments

US
Public interest has been considered as the core of "democratic theories of government” and often paired with two other concepts, "convenience" and "necessity". in the United States, public interest, convenience and necessity appeared for the first time in the Transportation Act of 1920 and also appeared in the Radio Act of 1927. After that, these three concepts became critical criteria for making communication policies and solving some related disputes.

India
Indian constitution invokes the term 'public interest' at nine places in its Articles 22 (6), 31A (b) and 31A (c) of fundamental rights of people, 263, 302, Entries 52, 54 and 56 of union list and Entry 33 of the concurrent list. In the absence of interpretation (Dos and don'ts) of the term 'public interest' by the courts in India, these Articles are being misused by the union lawmakers to usurp the constitutional powers of the state governments and the rights of people in contrast to the meaning of 'public interest'.

See also

Cause lawyering
Common good
Condorcet paradox
General will
National interest
Pareto optimality
Radio Act of 1927
Telecommunications Act of 1996
Social Credit System
Social Engineering
Software in the Public Interest

References

Human rights
Practice of law
Politics
Interest